Sky Showcase is a British pay television channel which launched on 1 September 2021 along with Sky Max. It is owned and operated by Sky Group, a division of American media company Comcast.

The channel was announced on 28 July 2021 to replace Sky One. It broadcasts a selection of programmes from across Sky's portfolio of channels - Sky Witness, Sky Documentaries, Sky Crime, Sky Nature, Sky Arts, Sky Max, Sky Comedy, Sky History, Sky Kids, Sky Sci-Fi and E! - as well as selected highlights from Sky Cinema, Sky News, and Sky Sports. The channel is being seen by Sky as their flagship channel and as a replacement for Sky One, whose programming transferred to another new channel - Sky Max - and to Sky Comedy. A version in Germany was launched on 4 August 2022.

Programming

Sky Showcase only 
All Hail King Julien
DreamWorks Dragons: Rescue Riders
The Croods: Family Tree
The Mighty Ones
The Simpsons

Sky Arts simulcasts 
Simulcasts with Sky Arts
Landmark

Sky Comedy simulcasts 
Simulcasts with Sky Comedy
American Auto
And Just Like That...
Avenue 5
Breeders
Code 404
Futurama
Last Week Tonight with John Oliver
Modern Family
Rosie Molloy Gives Up Everything
Romantic Getaway
The Conners
The Fresh Prince of Bel-Air
Wellington Paranormal
Will & Grace
Young Rock

Sky Crime simulcasts 
Simulcasts with Sky Crime
Motorway Patrol
Nothing to Declare

Sky Documentaries simulcasts 
Simulcasts with Sky Documentaries
Hawking and The Bambers: Murder at the Farm

Sky Kids simulcasts 
Simulcasts with Sky Kids
Abominable and the Invisible City
Madagascar: A Little Wild
Trolls: TrollsTopia

Sky Max simulcasts 
Simulcasts with Sky Max
A Discovery of Witches (series 3) (2022)
A League of Their Own
Agatha Raisin (series 4) (2021–present)
Brassic (series 3–4) (2021–present)
COBRA (series 2–3) (2021–present)
Football's Funniest Moments
Frayed (series 2) (2022)
Hold The Front Page
Magnum P.I.
Moominvalley (series 3–4) (2022–present)
NCIS: Los Angeles
NCIS: New Orleans
Peacemaker
Resident Alien
SEAL Team
Supergirl
S.W.A.T.
Temple (series 2) (2021)
The Blacklist
The Flash
The Flight Attendant
The Lazarus Project (2022)
The Lost Symbol (2021)
The Midwich Cuckoos (2022)
The Rising (2022)
Wolfe (2021)

Sky Witness simulcasts 
Simulcasts with Sky Witness
The Equalizer (2021)

Sky Nature simulcasts 
Simulcasts with Sky Nature
Big Cats: An Amazing Animal Family
Impossible Animals
Monkey Life
Shark with Steve Backshall

Sky News simulcasts 
Simulcasts with Sky News
Kay Burley
Sky News at 9
The Early Rundown

Sky Sci-Fi simulcasts 
Simulcasts with Sky Sci-Fi
From (26 July)

Sky Sports simulcasts 
Simulcasts with Sky Sports
FA Women's Super League
Formula One
Live Boxing
Premier League Live
Soccer AM
The Open Championship round 3 and 4

Notes

References

Sky television channels
Television channels and stations established in 2021
English-language television stations in the United Kingdom
Television channels in the United Kingdom
2021 establishments in the United Kingdom